Eswatini competed at the 2019 African Games held from 19 to 31 August 2019 in Rabat, Morocco. The country competed in two sports, athletics and Taekwondo, and did not win any medals.

Athletics 

Sibusiso Matsenjwa competed in the men's 100 metres and men's 200 metres events. He reached the semi-finals in the 100 metres event and the finals in the 200 metres event. In the 200 metres event he finished in 5th place with a time of 20.83.

Andile Lusenga competed in the men's 200 metres event and the men's 400 metres events. He reached the semi-finals in both events.

Phumlile Sibonakele Ndzinisa competed in the women's 100 metres and women's 200 metres events. She also reached the semi-finals in both events.

Taekwondo 

Two athletes competed in Taekwondo.

References 

Nations at the 2019 African Games
2019
African Games